Naomi Awards was an award ceremony dedicated to the year's worst music acts. It was a parody of the BRIT Awards, and was run by the music channel Music Choice. They were named after supermodel Naomi Campbell, whose own 1994 single "Love and Tears" was seen by Music Choice as a supremely awful example of the genre. They were voted for by selected music industry figures.

2005 winners
Worst British Group - Blue
Worst British Male - Jamie Cullum
Worst British Female - Rachel Stevens
Worst British Single - "I Believe My Heart" by Duncan James and Keedie Babb
Worst British Album - The Meaning of Love by Michelle McManus
Worst International Male - Brian McFadden
Worst International Female - Nadia Almada
Worst International Group - Westlife
Worst International Album - The Long Road Back by Peter Andre
Worst International Breakthrough - DJ Casper
Worst British Breakthrough Act - McFly
Worst British Attempt at Rock - Busted
Worst Pop Act - Sam & Mark
Worst Live Act - Pete Doherty
Least Convincing 'Urban' Act - Blazin' Squad
Outstandingly Bad Contribution to Music - Louis Walsh

2006 winners
 Worst British Male Solo Artist - Lee Ryan
 Worst British Female Solo Artist - Lisa Scott-Lee
 Worst British Album - Heart and Soul by Steve Brookstein
 Worst British Single - "Electric" by Lisa Scott-Lee
 Worst Attempt at Rock - Son of Dork
 Worst Urban Act - Ms. Dynamite
 Worst Live Act - Babyshambles
 Worst Pop Act - Lisa Scott-Lee
 Worst International Male Solo Artist - Jack Johnson
 Worst International Female Solo Artist - Jessica Simpson
 Worst International Album - Face to Face by Westlife
 Worst International Group - Westlife
 Worst International Breakthrough Artist - The Pussycat Dolls
 Outstandingly Bad Contribution to Music - Westlife

See also 

 Golden Raspberry Awards

References

British music awards
Ironic and humorous awards